Don Bosco High School, Hojai is a school located in Hojai, Assam. It is a Catholic school founded on the teachings of Saint John Bosco, and is run by the Salesians of Don Bosco. Don Bosco is one of the leading private schools in the North-Eastern states. The school is managed by a Principal, with Vice Principals and Teacher-Coordinators operating under him. The school currently houses more than 1000 students.

References

External links 
 http://www.salesians.org/salesians.html
 http://donboscoindia.com/english/defaultbosco.php
Topper from Don Bosco High School, Hojai

Schools in Guwahati
Christian schools in Assam
Educational institutions in India